"The History of the World (Part 1)" is a single by English rock band the Damned, released in September 1980 by Chiswick Records. It was co-produced by the band with Hans Zimmer and was included on the band's The Black Album. The record was released in both 7" and 12" formats, and reached No. 51 in the UK Singles Chart.

Critical reception 
Writing in Smash Hits magazine, reviewer David Hepworth wrote, "The Damned seem to be making overtures to the mainstream, knocking timidly on the door of daytime radio and asking to be let in. With keyboards to the fore instead of the usual guitars, this is not unlike the kind of half baked effort you'd expect from Supertramp, if they were trying to grab a bit of new wave credibility".

Production credits
Producers
 Hans Zimmer
 The Damned

Musicians
 Dave Vanian − vocals
 Captain Sensible − guitar, vocals on "I Believe The Impossible"
 Rat Scabies − drums
 Paul Gray − bass
 Hans Zimmer - synthesiser

References

External links

1980 singles
The Damned (band) songs
Songs written by Rat Scabies
Songs written by Captain Sensible
Songs written by David Vanian
Songs written by Paul Gray (English musician)
1980 songs
Chiswick Records singles